Ball Play is an unincorporated community in Polk County, Tennessee, in the United States.

History
Ball Play was named from the Indigenous North American stickball played at an Indian settlement near the town site.

References

Unincorporated communities in Polk County, Tennessee
Unincorporated communities in Tennessee